Asa Kent Jennings (1877–1933) was a Methodist pastor from upstate New York and a member of the YMCA. In 1904, while in his twenties, Jennings was struck down by Pott's disease, a type of tuberculosis which affects the spine. As a result of his tuberculosis, he stood not much taller than 5 foot and with a noticeable hunch back. In 1922, he commanded the evacuation of 350,000 helpless refugees from the shores of Smyrna (today İzmir) in Turkey following the Great Fire of Smyrna. For his work, Greece awarded Jennings its highest civilian honour,  the Order of the Redeemer, and the highest war honour, the medal of Military Merit. 

In 1945, MGM Studios made a 10-minute short film based on the life of Asa Jennings.

In 2022, a documentary featuring Asa K. Jennings and his heroic efforts was produced by Mike Damergis. Smyrna - Paradise is Burning, The Asa K. Jennings story, was awarded Best Historical Film by Cannes World Film Festival (May).
https://www.youtube.com/channel/UC4zth97eFyxYkD6bsdMMMHw

References

External links
 Strange Destiny, MGM short film

Smyrna - Paradise is Burning, The Asa K Jennings story

1877 births
1933 deaths
American humanitarians
American Methodist clergy
Greek genocide